Epicephala bipollenella is a moth   of the family Gracillariidae. It is found in Fujian, China and the Ryukyu Archipelago.

The larvae feed on Glochidion hirsutum and Glochidion zeylanicum.

References

Epicephala
Moths described in 2012